is a Japanese rugby union player. Tamura currently plays for the Canon Eagles rugby team. His regular playing positions are fly-half and Centre.

Education
Tamura studied at Meiji University.

Playing career
Tamura plays for the Sunwolves and the Canon Eagles. He was named in Japan's squad for the 2015 Rugby World Cup and the 2019 Rugby World Cup in Japan.

References

External links 
 
 Top League Profile, in Japanese

1989 births
Living people
Japanese rugby union players
Japan international rugby union players
Sportspeople from Aichi Prefecture
Rugby union fly-halves
Rugby union centres
Green Rockets Tokatsu players
Sunwolves players
Yokohama Canon Eagles players